Streptomyces malachitofuscus is a bacterium species from the genus of Streptomyces. Streptomyces malachitofuscus has antifungal metabolites.

See also 
 List of Streptomyces species

References

Further reading

External links
Type strain of Streptomyces malachitofuscus at BacDive -  the Bacterial Diversity Metadatabase

malachitofuscus
Bacteria described in 1986